Tupilați is a commune in Neamț County, Western Moldavia, Romania. It is composed of four villages: Arămoaia, Hanul Ancuței, Totoiești, and Tupilați.

References

Communes in Neamț County
Localities in Western Moldavia